The 34th Saturn Awards, honoring the best in science fiction, fantasy and horror film and television in 2007 were presented on June 24, 2008 in Universal City Hilton Hotel in Los Angeles, California.

Below is a complete list of nominees and winners. Winners are highlighted in boldface.

Winners and nominees

Film

Television

Programs
{| class=wikitable
|-
! style="background:#EEDD82; width:50%" |Best Network Television Series
! style="background:#EEDD82; width:50%" |Best Syndicated/Cable Television Series
|-
| valign="top" |
Lost (ABC)Heroes (NBC)
Journeyman (NBC)
Pushing Daisies (ABC)
Supernatural (The CW)
Terminator: The Sarah Connor Chronicles (Fox)
| valign="top" |Dexter (Showtime)Battlestar Galactica (Sci-Fi)
The Closer (TNT)
Kyle XY (ABC Family)
Saving Grace (TNT)
Stargate SG-1 (Sci-Fi)
|-
! style="background:#EEDD82; width:50%" |Best Television Presentation
! style="background:#EEDD82; width:50%" |Best International Series
|-
| valign="top" |Family Guy: "Blue Harvest" (Fox)
Battlestar Galactica: Razor (Sci-Fi)
The Company (TNT)
Fallen (ABC Family)
Masters of Science Fiction (ABC)
Shrek the Halls (ABC)
Tin Man (Sci-Fi)
| valign="top" |Doctor Who (BBC)Cape Wrath (Channel 4)
Jekyll (BBC One)
Life on Mars (BBC One)
Robin Hood (BBC One)
Torchwood (BBC Three)
|}Note: The category Best International Series was omitted from the Saturn Awards press release as issued on June 24, 2008, but was added to a corrected press release and website update on June 26.

Acting

DVD
{| class=wikitable
|-
! style="background:#EEDD82; width:50%" | Best DVD Release
! style="background:#EEDD82; width:50%" | Best Special Edition DVD Release
|-
| valign="top" |The Cabinet of Dr. Caligari
Behind the Mask: The Rise of Leslie Vernon
Driftwood
The Man from Earth
The Nines
White Noise 2: The Light
| valign="top" |
Blade Runner: 5-Disc Ultimate Collector's EditionBig: Extended Edition
Close Encounters of the Third Kind: 30th Anniversary Edition Blu-ray
Death Proof: Extended and Unrated
Pan's Labyrinth: Platinum Series
Troy: Director's Cut – Ultimate Collector's Edition
|-
! style="background:#EEDD82; width:50%" | Best Classic Film DVD Release
! style="background:#EEDD82; width:50%" | Best DVD Movie Collection
|-
| valign="top" |The Monster Squad
Alligator
The Dark Crystal
Face/Off
Flash Gordon
Witchfinder General
| valign="top" |
The Mario Bava Collection
The Godzilla Collection
The Sergio Leone Anthology
The Sonny Chiba Collection
Stanley Kubrick: Warner Home Video Directors Series
Vincent Price: MGM Screen Legends Collection
|-
! style="background:#EEDD82; width:50%" | Best DVD Television Release
! style="background:#EEDD82; width:50%" | Best Retro Television Series on DVD
|-
| valign="top" |
Heroes: Season 1Eureka: Season 1
Hustle: Seasons 2 & 3
Lost: Season 3
Spooks: Volumes 4 & 5
Planet Earth: The Complete BBC Series
| valign="top" |Twin Peaks: The Definitive Gold Box EditionGreat Performances: "Count Dracula" – The Complete BBC Mini-SeriesLand of the Giants: The Complete SeriesMission: Impossible: Seasons 2 & 3The Wild Wild West: Seasons 2 & 3The Young Indiana Jones Chronicles Volume 1: The Early Years
|}

Special awards
The George Pal Memorial Award
Guillermo del Toro

The Special Achievement Award
Tim & Donna Lucas

The Service Award
Fred Barton

Life Career Award
Robert Halmi, Sr. and Robert Halmi, Jr.

Filmmakers Showcase Award
Matt Reeves for Cloverfield''.

References

External links
 The Official Saturn Awards Site

Saturn Awards ceremonies
Saturn
Saturn